Vincent Aycocho, or better known as Petite is a Filipino actor, comedian, singer and TV show host. He is known for as a Filipino comedian in Comedy Bar, Punch line and Clowns, together with their other celebrities; Boobay, Iyah, Donita Nose, Ate Gay, Allan K. and Wally Bayola. Petite had more projects on GMA Network, such as hosting CelebriTV, which was co-hosted with Joey de Leon.

Career
After in comedy bar Petite has a numerous shows in GMA Network; Petite signed a contract on GMA Network in 2014 as an actor and comedian, Petite guesting in CelebriTV, and joining the Bulaga Pa More! in Eat Bulaga! as a performer, Sunday PinaSaya guesting in Kalyeserye as a applicant role and in Vampire ang Daddy Ko as special guest.

Comedy Bar
Petite is a singer and performer in a Philippine TV comedian series Comedy Bar, hosting Boobay, Fabio Ide and others, he is a best notable work in Comedy Bar before CelebriTV.

Kalyeserye
Petite is one of the cast in Kalyeserye as the applicant of Lola in Kalyeserye as Yaya Git before he appear in Eat Bulaga! on his role who has difficulty raising both arms saying raise the roof; together with Yaya-in, Yaya Glo and Yaya Pak. After Kalyeserye, Petite appearing extended cast by his role in Vampire ang Daddy Ko, with Iyah.

Filmography

Film
 2017 - Mang Kepweng Returns as Petite
 2018 - Mamu and a Mother Too as Petite
 2019 - The Mall, The Merrier as Casim

Television

See also
 Boobay
 Jose Manalo
 Wally Bayola
 Ate Gay

References

Gay comedians
Living people
Filipino television presenters
Filipino gay actors
Filipino male comedians
Filipino male film actors
Year of birth missing (living people)
Filipino male television actors
GMA Network personalities